Sergeyevka is a rural locality (a selo) in Buzdyaksky Selsoviet, Buzdyaksky District, Bashkortostan, Russia. The population was 702 as of 2010. There are 5 streets.

Geography 
Sergeyevka is located 8 km northeast of Buzdyak (the district's administrative centre) by road. Tuktarkul is the nearest rural locality.

References 

Rural localities in Buzdyaksky District